The A563 is the designation for the ring road of Leicester, England. An indirect route linking the gap involves the (A47) A6030, and A6. The A563 was formerly referred to as the Outer Ring.

Route (described in a clockwise direction)
Starting around the south-east of the city region at the A6 in Oadby  the road goes west, between Knighton and Wigston (crossing the A5199 Welford Road), then to the south of Aylestone (crossing the A426), passing Fosse Shopping Park that lies to the north. It crosses the B4114 (Fosse Way), then in close proximity it passes over and intersects with the A5460, giving access to the M1 and M69 motorways. It then turns north, parallel to the M1, and crosses the A47 and then the A50. As the road bears eastward at Beaumont Leys there is a junction with the A5630, providing a link to the A46 Leicester Western Bypass.

Directly north of the city the A563 arrives at Red Hill Circle in Belgrave, near to the River Soar, and crosses the A6 again. It then passes east. After crossing the A607 it turns south-eastward and transects with the northern terminus of the A6030 (which serves as a bis alternate route for traffic progressing directly towards Oadby/Stoneygate). Continuing, the A563 turns south and finishes at the A47 , towards the city's eastern boundary at Goodwood/Rowlatts Hill, north of Evington village.

Here the A563 ring road ends, given that the section directly linking the A47 at Goodwood to the A6 in Oadby was not constructed. Traffic can continue straight on at the A47 junction down the Goodwood Road (or go via the A47 and Spencefield Lane) and then continue by a variety of routes to the A6: by Evington to Stoughton Drive and then Stoughton Road, thus meeting the A6 considerably nearer to the city centre than is Oadby, or alternatively turning at Evington village onto the back road Shady Lane, and then proceed by Stoughton Road into Oadby, meeting the A6 further out.

Developments
Recently a short section of road linking the A563 in Hamilton and the A6030 to the west was completed between the junction with Victoria Road East and Gipsy Lane to the south, and Thurmaston Lane to the north, to assist traffic to the A6 and Oadby. Building this section meant having to cut through part of the Humberstone Heights Golf Course.

Although the ring road has been planned for decades, there are currently no firm plans to complete the eastern part, known as the Eastern District Distributor Road. The original designated route included Goodwood Road, but Leicester City Council allowed housing to be built on land earmarked for an expansion to a dual carriageway. Tentative plans to route traffic along Spencefield Lane were strongly opposed by residents, leaving it unclear where exactly the Distributor Road would be built. The A47 is not dual carriageway and is already congested at peak hours, so extending the A563 eastwards as far as open countryside seems problematic.

See also 
A594 road (Leicester)

References 

Roads in England
Transport in Leicester
Transport in Leicestershire
Ring roads in the United Kingdom